The 2017 TCR China season was the first season of the TCR's Chinese Touring Car Championship.

Teams and drivers

Calendar and results
The 2017 schedule was announced on 18 December 2016, with five events scheduled one invitation round in Macau. Yet all cars from TCR China withdrew from the Macau race due to freight delay.

Championship standings

Drivers' championship

References

External links
TCR China Series Official website
 Updated calendar TCR China Series

China Touring Car Championship
TCR China Series
TCR China Series